are a Japanese female idol group. The group was created by 3B Junior, the third section of the talent agency Stardust Promotion. Shiritsu Ebisu Chugaku is considered a "little sister" group to another Stardust Promotion girl group, Momoiro Clover Z.

Shiritsu Ebisu Chugaku is named after a fictitious school in Ebisu, a neighborhood in Shibuya, Tokyo. It was planned as a group of elementary and middle school students. However, this concept has changed as the members aged. The group currently uses "Forever a Middle-schooler" as their concept.

The group was officially nicknamed "King of the School Play", and was advertised as being a group with very rough singing and dancing skills. Or, more accurately, the group's slogan at the time was "Unarticulated dance and shaky vocals." However, the group has outgrown said slogan over time, and have since reached a point where they're praised for their vocal skills. Originally formed as a quintet on August 4, 2009, the lineup has changed multiple times since then, with some members having "changed school" (the group's official term for leaving it) and some having "transferred in" (joined). The most recent lineup change occurred on October 1, 2022 when 2 new members were integrated into the group.

History

Formation and "indie" years (2009–2012) 
Ebichu was formed as a quintet on August 4, 2009. The original lineup consisted of Kanon, Mizuki, Narumi Uno, Reina Miyazaki and Rika Mayama. The group started out performing short sets (often opening for Momoiro Clover) at malls and shopping centers. In October, Ayaka Yasumoto and Natsu Anno were added to the lineup.

On February 14, 2010, Kanon announced her departure from the group. On the same day, Hinaki Yano was announced as a new member. The group's first single "Asa no Chime ga Narimashita" was released the same day as well.

In April, Aika Hirota was added as a new member. One month later in May, four new members: Mirei Hoshina, Rio Koike, Hirono Suzuki and Rina Matsuno, were announced, bringing the total number of members to 12.

The group released their second single, "Ebizori Diamond!!", on August 7.

On November 23, it was announced that Narumi Uno would be departing the group on January 10. In addition, Hinata Kashiwagi was announced as a new member. From this day until Uno's departure, the group's lineup reached its peak at 13 members.

On January 10, 2011, the group released their third single "Chime! / Doshaburi Regret". Narumi Uno departed the same day.

It was announced on February 21 that Hinaki Yano would depart from the group, and her final performance would take place on March 20. However, due to the 2011 Tōhoku earthquake and tsunami, her departure was postponed to April 17. On April 27, the group released their 4th single "The Tissue ~Tomaranai Seishun~".

Rio Koike announced through a blog post on June 7, that she would be departing from the group to focus on her education.

In June, it was announced that Ebichu was to hold their first solo concert, on October 8 at Shibuya O-East. Parts of it were released on the band's first live DVD, which was released on February 15 of the next year. In total, Ebichu gave three sold-out performances in October.

Two more singles, "Oh My Ghost? ~Watashi ga Akuryou ni Nattemo~" and "Motto Hashire!!", were released in July and October respectively.

Reina Miyazaki announced her departure from the group in December. This would be Ebichu's last lineup change for several years.

As of March 2012, there were nine members and the only two original members who still remained in the group were Mayama and Mizuki. Although in April 2012 they both entered high school, it was decided that they would remain in the group. They started joking that they were middle school students forever.

Major label debut and Chunin  (2012–2013) 
After six "indie" singles on their talent agency's recording label, the latest few of which charted on Oricon, the group signed a temporary contract with the major label Defstar Records to release a single titled, incidentally, "Karikeiyaku no Cinderella" ("Temporary Contract Cinderella"). The release date had already been determined as May 5, 2012, the Children's Day. The contract signing was made into a ceremony, which was held on March 4 in the presence of a large audience of fans.  The single "Karikeiyaku no Cinderella" debuted at number 7 in the Oricon daily ranking for May 1. Having peaked in the daily chart at number 2, it also debuted at number 7 in the Oricon Weekly Singles Chart.

From March 11 to May 20, Ebichu embarked on their first major tour, titled "Shiritsu Ebisu Chugaku Spring DefSTAR Tour 2012 ~Korya Haru kara Ebi ga ii!~", totaling 26 performances.

On June 25, 2012, Shiritsu Ebisu Chugaku performed at "Yubi Matsuri", an idol festival produced by Rino Sashihara from AKB48. The concert was held at Nippon Budokan before a crowd of 8,000 people and featured such girl groups as Idoling!!!, Super Girls, Tokyo Girls' Style, Nogizaka46, Passpo, Buono!, Momoiro Clover Z, and Watarirouka Hashiritai 7.

On July 1, 2012, Ebichu held a three and a half hour solo concert at Nippon Seinenkan. The show was called "Jā Best Ten" and featured an imaginary ranking of the group's songs, counted down in the style of 1980s music TV shows. It also included the first public performance of the song "Go! Go! Here We Go! Rock Lee", a closing theme of the anime Naruto SD, to be released as the group's second single in August.

From July 14 to September 16, Ebichu embarked on a Summer tour titled "Shiritsu Ebisu Chugaku Summer DefSTAR Saikyou Tour 2012 ~Hajikeru Ase no Shio Tengoku~", totaling 19 performances.

Ebichu's 2nd major single, "Go! Go! Here We Go! Rock Lee / Otona wa Wakattekurenai" was released on August 29, and reached number 7 on the weekly chart.

From November 4 to January 20, Ebichu conducted a winter tour, titled "Shiritsu Ebisu Chugaku Winter DefSTAR Gokujo Tour 2012–2013 ~KING OF GAKUGEEEEKAI of Chu of LIFE~", totaling 15 performances.

On November 21, Ebichu released a compilation album titled "Ebichu no Zeppan Best: Owaranai Seishun", featuring all the material released during their "Indie" years.

On December 15, the group held a solo concert at Nakano Sunplaza titled "Ebichu no Jungle Daibouken".

Ebichu's 3rd single, titled "Ume" was released on January 16, 2013. The girls declared that they were aiming for third place in the Oricon chart with their third single, a goal that they managed to achieve.

From April 21 to June 9, Ebichu went on tour, this time titled "Shiritsu Ebisu Chugaku Spring DefSTAR Tonden Tour 2013 ~Chance wa Ima da! Kou-unki ni Notte Yoikorasho~", totaling 12 performances.

Their 4th single "Te o Tsunagō / Kindan no Karma", featuring two ending theme songs for Pocket Monsters Best Wishes Season 2, was released on June 5.

Ebichu released their 1st studio album "Chunin" on July 24, containing tracks from all 4 singles released since their major label debut

On July 28, Ebichu held an outdoor concert titled "Ebichu Natsu no Family Ensoku" or "Famien" for short. The outdoor summer "Famien" concerts have since become an annual event, being held every year since 2013.

From September 22 to November 17, Ebichu held another tour, "Shiritsu Ebisu Chugaku Autumn DefSTAR COMECOME Tour 2013 ~Deluxe Jam Jamboree Neo~" totaling 15 performances.

Their 5th single "Mikakunin Chugakusei X" was released on November 20.

On December 8, Ebichu performed a standalone concert at Saitama Super Arena, beating the record held by SID for fastest performance at the venue since a group's debut.

On December 28 it was announced that 3 members, Mizuki, Natsu Anno and Hirono Suzuki, would be leaving the group, and that their last concert would be held on April 15, 2014, at the Nippon Budokan. After leaving, they will focus on acting, as well as their academics.

Lineup changes and Kinpachi (2014–2015) 
On January 4, it was announced that Kaho Kobayashi and Riko Nakayama, both former members of the training unit "Team Daio-Ika", would be joining Ebichu as new members. From this day until April 15, Ebichu would consist of 11 members. However, the new members did not share the stage with the 3 departing members during this period.

On March 9, the "Chunin" era lineup, minus Anno who was studying abroad, performed a concert at Makuhari Event Hall in Chiba, titled "Luck To The Future". 12 days later, on March 21, the new 8 member lineup with Kobayashi and Nakayama performed the same setlist at Grand Cube Osaka.

On April 15, Ebichu held a concert titled "Shiritsu Ebisu Chugaku Goudou Shuppatsushiki ~Ima, Kimi ga Koko ni Iru~", at the Nippon Budokan. This was their last performance with Mizuki, Anno and Suzuki. The main set was performed by the "Chunin" lineup, with Kobayashi and Nakayama joining them for the encore. The encore was the only time that the 3 departing members performed together with the 2 new members.

From April 27 to June 15, Ebichu held their first tour with Kobayashi and Nakayama, titled "Shiritsu Ebisu Chugaku Spring Sony Music Labels Rookie Tour 2014 ~Umare Kawari Chou Chou Born to Etcetera~", totaling 13 performances.

On June 4, Ebichu released their 6th single "Butterfly Effect", their first release featuring Kobayashi and Nakayama.

The second installment of the annual "Famien" summer outdoor concerts was held on August 2.

From September 15 to October 12, a short tour titled "Shiritsu Ebisu Chugaku Autumn Sony Music Labels Hanuke Tour 2014 ~Doukasen Pachipachi hahaha n~" was held, totaling 4 performances.

On November 5, Ebichu released their 7th single "Haitateki!".

Ebichu performed several large-scale concerts in November and December, performing at Yokohama Arena, Kobe World Kinen Hall, and Ariake Colosseum.

On January 28, 2015, Ebichu released their second studio album "Kinpachi", featuring all singles released after "Chunin", with tracks from the previous lineup being re-recorded. In support of the album, they embarked on a tour titled "Shiritsu Ebisu Chugaku Tobidase Zen-Juu Hall Tour 2015 ~Wakkuwaku Haru Balloon GOGO~", totaling 13 performances.

On February 6, Ebichu made their first appearance on the popular music TV show "Music Station", and performed the title track to their new album.

Anarchy (2015–2016) 
In March, under the name 5572320, Ebichu was chosen to promote the "Coconut Sable" brand of cookies. They digitally released the song "Hanseiki Yūtōsei" on March 25, and continued to release songs as 5572320 into 2016.

On June 17, Ebichu released their 8th single "Natsudaze Johnny".

The third installment of the annual "Famien" summer outdoor concerts was held on August 22.

On September 22, Ebichu performed a special concert in Akita prefecture, titled "Akita Bunkou". This has also since become an annual event in the following years.

Ebichu's 9th single "Superhero" was released on October 21.

Ebichu returned to Saitama Super Arena and performed two consecutive nights on December 12–13.

On December 17, it was announced that Hinata Kashiwagi had been diagnosed with sudden deafness and that the release of the group's third album "Anarchy", scheduled for release on 10 February 2016, had been postponed for an indefinite period of time.

After the delay, Ebichu's third studio album "Anarchy" was released on April 20, 2016. To support the album, Ebichu embarked on a 15 date tour titled "Shiritsu Ebisu Chugaku Japan Hall Keikiiii Tour 2016 ~the snack bar in gakugeeeekai~".

The fourth annual "Famien" was held on August 20.

On August 27, it was announced that Kaho Kobayashi had been diagnosed with a mild case of Graves' Disease. As a result, Kobyashi, along with Kashiwagi who injured her foot, would only participate vocally for concerts, and wouldn't participate in the dancing until December.

Ebichu's 10th single, "Massugu" was released on September 21.

From September 22 to November 3, the tour "Shiritsu Ebisu Chugaku Aki Tour 2016 ~Ebichu-tte Gen-eki Chugakusei Hitori mo inai Group nandatte!~" was held, totaling 6 concerts.

On November 6, the group simultaneously released two best-of albums, ""Chūsotsu": Ebichū no Ike Ike Best" and ""Chūkara": Ebichū no Waku Waku Best". The former featured the single "Massugu", while latter featured a new song, titled "Sudden Death". All songs released prior to "Butterfly Effect" have been re-recorded with Kobayashi and Nakayama.

In December, Ebichu performed two consecutive nights at Yoyogi Dai-ichi Taiikukan, where Kobayashi and Kashiwagi returned to regular performing.

Ebicracy (2017–2018) 
On February 8, 2017,  Rina Matsuno died, aged 18. Matsuno was unable to perform at the group's concert the previous day due to feeling ill, and was resting at home in Tokyo. In the early morning on February 8 her condition suddenly worsened. At around 5 AM her parents called 119. She was taken in the ambulance, but pronounced dead at the hospital. On February 10, it was revealed that the cause of death was a cardiac arrhythmia. In her last post on Instagram on February 6 she said that she had returned from a family trip to Hakone.

All upcoming concerts and events were cancelled, and the group went into a period of mourning.

The group's website continued listing Rina Matsuno as a member until April 1. It was then announced that the group would continue on with the remaining 7 members, and that  a new album, titled "Ebicracy", would be released on May 31. The new album is the first Ebichu album to not feature any singles, consisting only of new material. "Ebicracy" charted at number 1 on both the Oricon and Billboard Japan weekly album charts, a first for Ebichu.

In support of the album, Ebichu embarked on a tour titled "Shiritsu Ebisu Chugaku IDOL march HALLTOUR 2017 ~Ima, Kimi to Koko ni Iru~", from April 22 to July 16. The last day of the tour, July 16, was Matsuno's birthday. After the show ended, an "end credits" video was played on screen, accompanied by a Rina Matsuno solo version of the song "Kanjou Densha", from "Ebicracy". This was possible because work on "Kanjou Densha" had begun earlier than the other songs, due to it being used in a commercial.

The fifth installment of the "Famien" summer concerts took place on August 26.

On August 31, Aika Hirota announced that she will be withdrawing from the group following a final concert on January 3, 2018.

On September 23, Ebichu performed a special autumn concert titled "Chūon", which has the audience remain seated, and features a live backing band. The members of Ebichu don't do choreographed dancing for the show, focusing all their energy on singing.

Ebichu's 11th single "Sing Along, Sing a Song" was released on November 8.

From October 8 to November 24, Ebichu's last tour with Hirota, "Shiritsu Ebisu Chugaku Autumn Nine Tour 2017 ~Ebichu-tte nanka Setsumei shizurai kedo Mitokanakya son-na Group nandatte!~" took place, totaling 9 concerts.

On January 3 and 4, 2018, Ebichu performed two consecutive shows at Nippon Budokan. The first, titled "forever aiai" was their last performance with Aika Hirota. The second, was their first performance with the current 6 member lineup, and was titled "ebichu pride".

10th anniversary, Music and Playlist (2018–2021) 
From April 21 to July 22, Ebichu embarked on their first tour with their current lineup, titled "Shiritsu Ebisu Chugaku SHAKARIKI SPRING TOUR 2018 ~New,Gakugeeeekai of Learning~ (Shin – Gakugeikai no Susume)", totaling 20 dates.

On May 23, Ebichu released a cover of "Jiyū e Michizure" by Ringo Sheena, as part of the tribute album "Adam to Eve no Ringo". The same day, Ebichu's discography was made available on music subscription services.

Ebichu's 12th single "Dekadonden" was released on June 6.

The sixth installment of the summer "Famien" shows, held for two days for the first time, took place on August 18–19.

On September 22, the second installment of the autumn "Chūon" shows took place.

From November 3 to December 1, Ebichu embarked on a 6 date tour titled "Shiristsu Ebisu Chugaku Aki Tour 2018 ~9nen-me, Gimu Kyouiku karano Sotsugyou~", with each date having a setlist decided by a different member.

From December 23 to 25, Ebichu performed 3 consecutive shows at Makuhari Event Hall. During the rehearsal for the second day, Mirei Hoshina fell from the stage, and was hospitalized. The following shows were performed with 5 members. While initially the extent of Hoshina's injuries was not made clear, it was later revealed that she had suffered a cerebral contusion, a fractured skull and a traumatic subarachnoid hemorrhage.

Hoshina made her return to the stage on February 17, 2019, performing one song with the other members. Following this, she continued to make limited appearances during concerts, gradually increasing the number of songs she participated in.

On March 13, Ebichu released their 5th album "MUSiC", the first in a series of releases commemorating their 10th anniversary as a group. The album contains the singles "Sing Along, Sing a Song" and "Dekadonden", with the former being re-recorded by the current lineup.

In support of the album, Ebichu embarked on a tour titled "Shiritsu Ebisu Chugaku Livehouse Tour 2019 ~Listen to the MUSiC~", totaling 10 dates.

On June 5, Ebichu released their 13th single "Trendy Girl".

On June 22, Ebichu hosted their own festival, "MUSiC Fes", featuring artists that the group has worked with over the years. This was the first full set that Hoshina performed with Ebichu since her fall.

The seventh annual "Famien" concert was held on August 17.

From September 20 to December 8, Ebichu embarked on a 16 date tour titled "Shiritsu Ebisu Chugaku Youkoso Aki Fuyu Hall Tour 2019 ~Sekai no Minasan Omedetou Idol tte Tanoshii~".

On October 18, it was announced that Ayaka Yasumoto would be going on an indefinite hiatus from the group, as she was experiencing instability both mentally and physically, and needed time to recuperate.

On December 18, Ebichu released their 6th album "playlist". The album features the single "Trendy Girl", and Ayaka Yasumoto fully participates on all of the songs. The album topped both the Oricon and Billboard Japan weekly charts, becoming the second Ebichu album to do so.

On December 20–21, Ebichu performed two consecutive shows at Makuhari Event Hall, featuring a live backing band.

On December 31, Ebichu held their first ever New Year's Countdown concert at Pacifico Yokohama.

On March 23, 2020, Ayaka Yasumoto announced that she would be gradually resuming activities.

Due to the COVID-19 Pandemic and its impact on the performing arts, the tour in support of "playlist" (originally scheduled to take place from April to July) was cancelled, and the 2020 installments of both the "Famien" and "MUSiC Fes" concerts were postponed to 2021.

On September 19–20, the third installment of the "Chuon" shows, this time consisting of 4 performances (2 per day), was held. This marked the first time Ebichu performed in front of a live audience since the outbreak of COVID-19.

On October 29, it was announced that Ayaka Yasumoto had been diagnosed with Malignant Lymphoma, and would be going on an indefinite hiatus to focus on treatment.

Ebichu performed 3 shows titled "Ebichu to New Girl Comrade" on December 18, 26 and 27, at the Tokyo International Forum & the Tokyo Garden Theater. These shows featured an all female backing band.

On January 1, it was announced that Shiritsu Ebisu Chhugaku will recruit new members during 2021 (between 10 and 22 years old) 

From March 6 to April 30, Ebichu embarked on a 6 date tour titled "Shiritsu Ebisu Chugaku Best at the moment series [6 Voices]". The tour symbolized the end of the 6 member lineup that lasted from January 2018.

On April 5, Ayaka Yasumoto announced that her cancer had been treated and was in a state of remission.

Self-Titled Album & Lineup changes (2021–present) 
On May 5, Ebichu announced their first new members in 7 years: Cocona Sakuragi, Yuno Kokubo & Nonoka Kazami. The 3 new members are scheduled to make their live debut at Famien 2021 in August.

In June, Ebichu, minus Ayaka Yasumoto & the new members, embarked on a 3 date tour titled "Shiritsu Ebisu Chugaku Concept Live ~MOVE~", which focused on the theme of movement.

On July 16, Ebichu (minus the 3 new members) appeared on the popular music YouTube channel "The First Take", where they performed the song "Nanairo". This marked Ayaka Yasumoto's official return to the group.

On August 18, the compilation album "FAMIEN'21 L.P." was released, containing new 9 member versions of past Famien theme songs.

The 2021 installment of Famien, scheduled for August 21-22, was again cancelled.

The new members made their live performance debut at the "@Jam Expo" festival on August 29. However, Riko Nakayama could not participate due to ill health, thus postponing the true debut of the new 9 member lineup.

Ebichu are scheduled to hold the fourth installment of the "Chuon" shows on September 25-26, consisting of 4 performances (2 per day).

On September 13, it was announced that Hinata Kashiwagi would be taking a break (scheduled for 3 months) from the group following the "Chuon" shows.

Kashiwagi returned to the group in November, and Ebichu performed 2 shows titled "Reboot" in December 2021.

Ebichu released their self titled 7th album on March 23, 2022.

On April 3 2022, Hinata Kashiwagi announced that she would be leaving the group in December 2022.

On October 1, 2022 Ebichu announced their new members: Emma Sakurai & Yuna Nakamura.

Hinata Kashiwagi performed her last concert with the group on December 16 at the Makuhari Event Hall. The next day, Sakurai & Nakamura made their debut performance at the same venue.

Musical style 
The group has recorded songs in many different genres, including pop, heavy metal, melodic hardcore, R&B, city pop and electro. The Japan-based music website CDJournal in its review of their 2016 best-of album "Chūsotsu": Ebichū no Ike Ike Best noted the group's individuality, the musicality of the songs as well as how their lyrics made use of individuality of each member.

Members 
The members are assigned so-called attendance numbers, just like in Japanese schools. Initially the numbers were given in the order of joining the group, and were reassigned when members left/joined. However, after Reina Miyazaki's departure, the numbers of the departing members have been retired. In addition, since around the time of their major-label debut, the members also have individual colors assigned to them.

Current members

Former members 

Members without color departed prior to their distribution

Timeline

Discography

Singles 

 * Cover single
 ** The song "Go! Go! Here We Go! Rock Lee" is an ending theme for the Naruto anime series "Rock Lee & His Ninja Pals" (Ep. 14 – 26).

Digital singles

Other charted songs

Vinyl singles

Studio albums

Compilation albums

Live albums

EPs

Video releases

Concerts and documentaries

Compilations

Theater

TV drama shows

TV variety shows 

 Limited-press box set (6DVD or 6BD) - 

 Limited-press box set (6DVD or 6BD) - 

 Vol.1 (DVD or BD) - 
 Vol.2 (DVD or BD) - 
 Vol.3 (DVD or BD) - 
 Vol.4 (DVD or BD) - 

 Vol.1 (DVD or BD) - 
 Vol.2 (DVD or BD) - 
 Vol.3 (DVD or BD) - 
 Vol.4 (DVD or BD) - 
 Vol.5 (DVD or BD) - 
 Vol.6 (DVD or BD) - 
 Vol.7 (DVD or BD) - 

 Director's Cut Vol.1 (DVD or BD) - 
 Director's Cut Vol.2 (DVD or BD) - 
 Director's Cut Vol.3 (DVD or BD) - 
 Director's Cut Vol.4 (DVD or BD) - 
 Director's Cut Vol.5 (DVD or BD) - 

 Box set (2DVD or 2BD) - 

 Director's Cut Vol.1 (DVD or BD) - 
 Director's Cut Vol.2 (DVD or BD) - 
 Director's Cut Vol.3 (DVD or BD) - 
Director's Cut Vol.4 (DVD or BD) - 
Director's Cut Vol.5 (DVD or BD) - 
Director's Cut Vol.6 (DVD or BD) - 

 Director's Cut Vol.1 (DVD or BD) - 
 Director's Cut Vol.2 (DVD or BD) - 
 Director's Cut Vol.3 (DVD or BD) -

Music videos

References

External links 
 
 
 
 Official USTREAM
  (The channel is not available outside Japan.)

 
Japanese pop music groups
Japanese girl groups
Japanese idol groups
Japanese-language singers
Musical groups established in 2009
2009 establishments in Japan
Musical groups from Tokyo
Child musical groups
Sony Music Entertainment Japan artists
Stardust Promotion artists
Defstar Records artists
Fictional schools